Taste The Music is the fifth album by New York City-based American band Kleeer.

Track listing
"Taste the Music" (Woody Cunningham, Norman Durham)  7:23	 	
"I've Had Enough (Can't Take It Anymore)" (Terry Dolphin, Woody Cunningham)  4:56	 	
"De Ting Continues" ( Paul Crutchfield, Norman Durham, Eric Rohrbaugh, Richard Lee, Jr.)  4:35	 	
"Wall to Wall" (Richard Lee, Jr.)  3:26	 	
"I Shall Get Over" (Woody Cunningham, Norman Durham)  6:29 		
"Fella" (Woody Cunningham)  4:49	 	
"Swann" (Paul Crutchfield)  4:40	 	
"Affirmative Mood" (Norman Durham, Woody Cunningham, Paul Crutchfield, Eric Rohrbaugh, Richard Lee, Jr.)  3:54

Personnel
Norman Durham - bass, electric piano, acoustic piano, synthesizer, Clavinet, cowbell, percussion, lead and backing vocals
Woody Cunningham - drums, synthesizer, cowbell, temple block, timbales, raps, lead and backing vocals
Paul Crutchfield - acoustic guitar, percussion, congas, backing vocals
Eric Rohrbaugh - electric piano, synthesizer, backing vocals
Richard Lee, Jr. - guitar, acoustic guitar, triangle, percussion
Terry Dolphin - acoustic piano, electric piano
Robbie Kondor, Louis Smalls - synthesizer
Michael Murphy - guitar, synthesizer programming
Jon Faddis - trumpet
Dennis King - intro vice announcement 
Melanie Moore - lead vocals and backing vocals
Isabelle Coles, Luther Vandross, Melissa Morgan, Yvette Flowers - backing vocals

Charts

Singles

References

External links
 Kleeer-Taste The Music at Discogs

1982 albums
Kleeer albums
Atlantic Records albums